The 2014 Mid-America Intercollegiate Athletics Association football season was made up of 12 United States college athletic programs that compete in the Mid-America Intercollegiate Athletics Association (MIAA) under the National Collegiate Athletic Association (NCAA) for the 2014 college football season. The season began play on August 31, 2014 and ended November 16, 2014.

Conference teams and information
Starting with the 2014 football season, the Lincoln Blue Tigers joined the Great Lakes Valley Conference as a football–only member, as well as the Southwest Baptist Bearcats. It was part of a "Strategic Conference Football Scheduling Alliance" between the MIAA and GLVC.

Coaches
Please note that the information listed is the information before the season started.

Preseason outlook
Sporting News released their Top-25 on June 10, 2014. Three teams from the conference were ranked in the top 25: #1 Northwest Missouri, #14 Pittsburg State, and #22 Emporia State. Two days later the Lindy's NCAA Division II Preseason Top 25 was released, where four teams placed in the top 25 from the conference: #1 Northwest Missouri, #6 Pittsburg State, #13 Emporia State, and #24 Missouri Western.

On August 5, MIAA Media Days was held in Kansas City. Northwest Missouri was chosen as #1 for both Coaches and Media polls. The schools were ranked as follows:

Coaches Poll
 Northwest Missouri
 Pittsburg State
 Central Missouri
 Emporia State
 Missouri Western
 Washburn
 Missouri Southern
 Fort Hays State
 Lindenwood
 Central Oklahoma
 Nebraska–Kearney
 Northeastern State

Media Poll
 Northwest Missouri
 Pittsburg State
 Emporia State
 Missouri Western
 Washburn
 Central Missouri
 Missouri Southern
 Fort Hays State
 Lindenwood
 Nebraska–Kearney
 Central Oklahoma
 Northeastern State

On August 18, the National Collegiate Athletics Association released the AFCA Coaches poll was released. The three MIAA teams that are ranked are: Northwest Missouri at #1, Pittsburg State at #9, and Emporia State tied at #22. Others that received votes were: Central Missouri with 82 votes, Missouri Western with 38, and Washburn with 2.

On August 26, D2football.com released their Top 25 poll. Four other MIAA schools were ranked in the D2football.com poll; Northwest Missouri State at #1, Pittsburg State at #9, Emporia State was chosen at #19 and Missouri Western at #24.

Schedule
The first week of conference play began on Thursday, September 4, 2014. The schedule is subject to change.

Week 1

Week 2

Week 3

Week 4

Week 5

Week 6

Week 7

Week 8

Week 9

Week 10

Week 11

Home game attendance

References